The South African Railways Class 15 4-8-2 of 1914 was a steam locomotive.

In 1914, the South African Railways placed ten Class 15 steam locomotives with a  Mountain type wheel arrangement in service.

Manufacturer
D.A. Hendrie, Chief Mechanical Engineer (CME) of the South African Railways (SAR), commenced with design work on the Class 15 in 1913. It was intended as a mixed-traffic locomotive for use in the Orange Free State, where gradients and curvature were less severe than on the coastal sections. The locomotive was similar in general layout to the Classes 12 and 14, but with larger  coupled wheels. Ten locomotives were built by the North British Locomotive Company (NBL) and delivered in February and March 1914, numbered in the range from 1561 to 1570.

Characteristics
The engines had plate frames, Walschaerts valve gear, Belpaire fireboxes without combustion chambers and were superheated.

To reduce the weight on the trailing wheels, steel fireboxes were originally used instead of copper since the water quality in the Free State was considered suitable for this metal. Some locomotives in Natal had been fitted with steel fireboxes years previously and the results were fairly good, but wherever water supplies were of poor quality, steel fireboxes gave a lot of trouble and necessitated the introduction of water treatment plants to prevent corrosion.

This reintroduction of steel fireboxes eventually led to its widespread use on all the larger locomotive types, but it also forced the SAR to adopt locomotive water treatment as a general policy. There was no settled policy on water treatment for some years, but engines with copper fireboxes were used mainly in areas where the water was not of good quality. Hendrie followed a conservative policy in this respect and steel fireboxes were only to be fitted in large numbers by his successor, Colonel F.R. Collins DSO.

In the case of the Class 15, it was still early days for water treatment and enough trouble was experienced to result in their steel fireboxes being replaced with copper fireboxes. The locomotive's one flaw was excessively long fire tubes.

Watson Standard boilers
During the 1930s, many serving locomotives were reboilered with a standard boiler type designed by A.G. Watson, CME of the SAR from 1929 to 1936, as part of his standardisation policy. Such Watson Standard reboilered locomotives were reclassified by adding an "R" suffix to their classification.

When all ten Class 15 locomotives were reboilered with Watson Standard no. 2A boilers, they were reclassified to Class 15AR since the only differences between the as-delivered Class 15 and the Class 15A lay in the length of their boilers and whether they were built with or without combustion chambers. In the process, the locomotives were also equipped with Watson cabs with their distinctive slanted fronts, compared to the conventional vertical fronts of their original cabs. During reboilering, some were equipped with steel and others with copper fireboxes.

Their original Belpaire boilers were fitted with Ramsbottom safety valves, while the Watson Standard boiler was fitted with Pop safety valves. Another obvious difference between an original and a Watson Standard reboilered locomotive is usually a rectangular regulator cover, just to the rear of the chimney on the reboilered locomotive. In the case of the Classes 15 and 15AR, two even more obvious differences are the Watson cab and the absence of the Belpaire firebox hump between the cab and boiler on the reboilered locomotives.

Service
The Class 15 was placed in service in the Orange Free State, shedded at Bloemfontein. After reboilering and reclassification, they became part of the much larger Class 15AR fleet and saw service widely throughout the country, getting used in every kind of role from dock shunting to mainline passenger work.

The Cape Northern examples were scattered between De Aar, Kimberley and Klerksdorp. The Cape Midland was a major user of the Class, with locomotives shedded at Sydenham in Port Elizabeth, Klipplaat, Graaff Reinet and Noupoort. The Class 15AR also worked the suburban services between Port Elizabeth and Uitenhage until they were replaced by diesel power.

Near the end of their service lives in the early 1980s, they were all relegated to shunting work at centres all around the country, except for some which were hired out to Swaziland and which were still employed in mainline service on the Swaziland Railway until they were also eventually replaced by diesel traction and retired.

Illustration
The main picture, showing the reboilered and reclassified Class 15AR no. 1566 at Port Elizabeth, and the following illustrate the Class before and after modification.

References

1810
1810
1810
4-8-2 locomotives
2D1 locomotives
NBL locomotives
Cape gauge railway locomotives
Railway locomotives introduced in 1914
1914 in South Africa
Scrapped locomotives